This is a list of cricketers who have played first-class, List A or Twenty20 cricket matches for the Uttarakhand cricket team. The team was granted top-level status in Indian domestic cricket in July 2018 and has competed in top-level competitions since the 2018–19 Indian cricket season.

The details given are the players name as it would usually appear on match scorecards. Note that some players will have played senior matches for other sides, including the India national cricket team.

A
 Sanyam Arora

B
 Rajat Bhatia
 Vaibhav Bhatt
 Himanshu Bisht
 Harshit Bisht
 Robin Bist
 Jay Bista

C
 Pradeep Chamoli
 Unmukt Chand
 Kunal Chandela
 Ashish Chaudhary
 Saurav Chauhan

D
 Rohit Dangwal
 Deepak Dhapola

F
 Samad Fallah

G
 Gaurav Singh
 Tanush Gusain

H
 Harman Singh

I
 Iqbal Abdulla

J
 Vijay Jethi
 Ashish Joshi
 Kartik Joshi
 Piyush Joshi

K
 Kamal Singh
 Sunny Kashyap
 Karanveer Kaushal
 Shivam Khurana
 Nikhil Kohli

M
 Akash Mandwaal
 Ankit Manor
 Mayank Mishra

N
 Mohammad Nazim
 Deepesh Nainwal
 Dikshanshu Negi

P
 Vaibhav Panwar
 Bhiguraj Pathania

R
 Sunny Rana
 Malolan Rangarajan
 Girish Raturi
 Saurabh Rawat

S
 Shubham Saundiyal
 Vineet Saxena
 Aditya Sethi
 Arya Sethi
 Rahil Shah
 Dhanraj Sharma
 Vijay Sharma
 Tanmay Srivastava
 Avneesh Sudha
 Swapnil Singh

T
 Agrim Tiwari

References 

Uttarakhand cricketers